Pulling Rabbits Out of a Hat is the thirteenth studio album by American pop and rock band Sparks, released in June 1984 by Atlantic Records. It was not very well received and failed to capitalise on the commercial success of their previous studio album In Outer Space (1983). The album developed the light synth-pop sound of In Outer Space but with slightly darker lyrics revolving around Ron Mael's favourite subject matter: relationships.

Release
Pulling Rabbits Out of a Hat did not chart in the US in spite of the popularity of their previous studio album In Outer Space (1983). In the UK, where the group hadn't charted since 1979, the album was also unsuccessful.

Three singles were lifted from the album. The lead single; "With All My Might" reached No. 104 on  Bubbling Under Hot 100 Singles and made the Billboard Hot Dance Music/Club Play chart; where it peaked at No. 28. The other two singles were "Pretending to Be Drunk" and "Progress", which were extended, remixed and released as club promos.

Track listing

Personnel
Credits are adapted from the Pulling Rabbits Out of a Hat liner notes.

Sparks
Ron Mael – synthesizers (Roland Jupiter-8, Yamaha DX7, Synclavier II, Fairlight CMI)
Russell Mael – vocals

Additional musicians
Leslie Bohem – bass, backing vocals
Bob Haag – guitar, synthesizer, backing vocals
David Kendrick – drums
John Thomas – keyboards

Production
Producer – Ian Little
Mixed by – Brian Reeves, Dave Bianco, Mick Guzauski
Engineer – Steve Bates

References

External links
 

Sparks (band) albums
1984 albums
Atlantic Records albums
Carrere Records albums
Oglio Records albums
Repertoire Records albums
Synth-pop albums by American artists